Sophia Monique Brown (born October 1991) is a British actress having had regular roles in  Marcella and Clique (2018), Giri/Haji (2019), The Capture (2020), and stars in the Netflix fantasy series The Witcher: Blood Origin in 2022.

Early life
Brown was born in Northampton. She graduated from Arts Educational Schools, London, and the Identity School of Acting in Brixton, where she trained in ballet, jazz and contemporary dance, and also studied at the Ivana Chubbuck Studio. She has been performing with the Theo Adams Company since 2015.

Career
Her TV credits include The Capture, Giri/Haji, Marcella, Clique, Guerrilla, Casualty and Top Boy. Her film credits include Disobedience, Beauty and the Beast and Genius.

In 2021, Brown was cast as Éile, a warrior blessed with the voice of a goddess in The Witcher: Blood Origin, a four-episode limited series, that is a prequel-spin-off to the Netflix series The Witcher.

Filmography

References

External links
 
 Sophia Brown on Instagram

Living people
1990s births
21st-century British actresses
21st-century British dancers
Actors from Northamptonshire
Black British actresses
British television actresses
British film actresses
British stage actresses
People educated at the Arts Educational Schools
People from Northampton
Year of birth missing (living people)